The Roman Catholic Archdiocese of Port of Spain is a metropolitan diocese of the Latin Church of the Roman Catholic Church in the Caribbean. The archdiocese encompasses the entirety of the former Spanish dependency of Trinidad, including the islands of Trinidad and Tobago. The archdiocese is the Metropolitan responsible for the suffragan Dioceses of Bridgetown, Georgetown, Paramaribo and Willemstad, and is a member of the Antilles Episcopal Conference.

The diocese of Port of Spain was originally erected as a vicariate apostolic in 1818 and elevated to an archdiocese in April 1830.

Communications
The archdiocese has its own special-purpose company, Catholic Media Services Limited (CAMSEL), responsible for coordinating communications.
The diocesan weekly newspaper, Catholic News, has been published in Trinidad since 1892 and since 2006 has been published by CAMSEL.

There is also a local TV station which operates under the aegis of the archdiocese but is independently owned and operated by the Living Water Community, a public association of Christian Faith founded in Trinidad.

The vicar for communications is Fr. Robert Christo.

Pastoral regions
The archdiocese is divided into six regions known as vicariates and each headed by a regional episcopal vicar.

 Central Vicariate
 Eastern Vicariate
 Northern Vicariate
 Southern Vicariate
 Suburban Vicariate
 Tobago Vicariate

See also
Roman Catholicism in Trinidad and Tobago

Bishops

Ordinaries
James Buckley (1819–1828)
Daniel McDonnell (bishop) (1828–1844)
Richard Patrick Smith (1844–1852)
Vincent Spaccapietra (1855–1859)
Ferdinand English (1860–1862)
Joachim-Hyacinthe Gonin, O.P. (1863–1889)
Patrick Vincent Flood, O.P. (1889–1907)
John Pius Dowling, O.P. (1909–1940)
Patrick Finbar Ryan, O.P. (1940–1966)
Gordon Anthony Pantin, C.S.Sp. (1967–2000)
Edward Joseph Gilbert, C.Ss.R. (2001–2011)
Joseph Everard Harris, C.S.Sp. (2011-2017)
Charles Jason Gordon (since 2017)

Coadjutor bishops
Richard Patrick Smith (1837-1844), as Coadjutor Vicar Apostolic
William Dominic O'Carroll, O.P. (1874-1880), did not succeed to see
Thomas Raymond Hyland, O.P. (1882-1884), did not succeed to see
George Vincent King, O.P.  1885-1886), did not succeed to see
Patrick Vincent Flood, O.P. (1887-1889)
Patrick Finbar Ryan, O.P. (1937–1940)
Joseph Everard Harris, C.S.Sp. (2011)

Auxiliary bishops
William Michael Fitzgerald, O.P. (1958-1968)
John Mendes (1988-2002)
Robert Anthony Llanos (2013-2018), appointed Bishop of Saint John's-Basseterre, Virgin Islands (British)

Other priests of this diocese who became bishops
Sydney Anicetus Charles, appointed Bishop of Saint George's in Grenada in 1974
Clyde Martin Harvey, appointed Bishop of Saint George's in Grenada in 2018
 Malcolm Patrick Galt, CSSp., appointed Bishop of Bridgetown in Barbados in 1995

References
The Archdiocese of Port of Spain official site

Roman Catholic dioceses in the Caribbean
Catholic Church in Trinidad and Tobago
Roman Catholic dioceses and prelatures established in the 19th century
Religious organizations established in 1818
A